Bogoslovskya is an extinct genus of actively mobile carnivorous cephalopod that lived in what would be Europe during the Silurian from 422.9—418.7 mya, existing for approximately .

Taxonomy
Cryptocycloceras It was assigned to Orthocerida by Sepkoski (2002).

Morphology
The shell is usually long, and may be straight ("orthoconic") or gently curved.  In life, these animals may have been similar to the modern squid, except for the long shell.

References

Cephalopod genera
Silurian cephalopods
Silurian extinctions
Prehistoric animals of Europe